The Münchner Merkur (literally "Munich Mercurius", i.e. the Roman god of messengers) is a German Bavarian daily subscription newspaper, which is published from Monday to Saturday. It is located in Munich and belongs to the Müncher Merkur/tz media group. The paid circulation of the Münchner Merkur is 271.335 copies.

History
The Merkur was the second newspaper after the Süddeutsche Zeitung which was allowed to be published in Munich. 1968 the subsidiary tz was brought onto the market as a tabloid.

The first edition of what was initially named Münchner Mittag ("Munich Noon"), was released on 13 November 1946 through a licence of the American military government. One of the founding members and publishers was Felix Buttersack.

In 1982, the Westphalian publisher Dirk Ippen purchased the Munich newspaper group including the newspapers Münchner Merkur and tz.

Every year since 1996, readers of the Münchner Merkur have been voting for the winner of the Merkur-Theaterpreis (Merkur-theatre-prize).

Chief editors
 1948–1963: Felix Buttersack
 1963–1973: Kurt Wessel
 1973–1975: Franz Wördemann
 1975–1983: Paul Pucher
 1983–1995: Werner Giers
 1995–2000: Peter Fischer
 2000–2000: Monika Zimmermann
 2000–2002: Wilhelm Christbaum
 2001–2007: Ernst Hebeker
 2007–2013: Karl Schermann
 since 2014: Bettina Bäumlisberger

Readership
Münchner Merkur has recorded 971.000 total readers, 488.000 of them male and 483.000 female readers.

References

External links
 Münchner Merkur

1946 establishments in Germany
Daily newspapers published in Germany
German-language newspapers
German news websites
Newspapers published in Munich
Newspapers established in 1946